The Condemned is a Big Finish Productions audio drama based on the long-running British science fiction television series Doctor Who.

Plot
In Manchester, 2008, the Doctor and his new companion Charley become embroiled in a murder mystery at Ackley House.

Cast
The Doctor — Colin Baker
Charley Pollard – India Fisher
D.I. Patricia Menzies – Anna Hope
Sam – Will Ash
Maxine – Sara De Freitas
Dr Joseph Aldrich – Lennox Greaves
Slater – James George
Antonia Bailey – Diana Morrison
Jane – Diana Morrison
D.C.I. Turnbull – Stephen Aintree
P.C. Blackstock – Steve Hansell

Cast notes
Anna Hope previously appeared as Novice Hame in the television episodes "New Earth" and "Gridlock".
Will Ash previously appeared in the television episode "42" as Riley.

Continuity
Charley Pollard previously left the Eighth Doctor at the end of The Girl Who Never Was.
D.I. Menzies reappears in The Raincloud Man and The Crimes of Thomas Brewster.
The Doctor is later revealed to be pretending he has never met Menzies before in this story, but actually he first met her in The Crimes of Thomas Brewster (produced later). For Menzies, The Condemned is the first time she has met the Doctor.
The fact that a tablet of aspirin could kill him is something the Third Doctor mentioned in The Mind of Evil.

External links
Big Finish Productions – The Condemned

Condemned
Condemned
Condemned, The
Fiction set in 2008